Euschistus biformis is a species in the family Pentatomidae ("stink bugs"), in the order Hemiptera ("true bugs, cicadas, hoppers, aphids and allies").
The distribution range of Euschistus biformis includes Central America and North America.

References

Further reading
 Henry, Thomas J., and Richard C. Froeschner, eds. (1988). Catalog of the Heteroptera, or True Bugs, of Canada and the Continental United States, xix + 958.
 Ross H. Arnett. (2000). American Insects: A Handbook of the Insects of America North of Mexico. CRC Press.
 Thomas J. Henry, Richard C. Froeschner. (1988). Catalog of the Heteroptera, True Bugs of Canada and the Continental United States. Brill Academic Publishers.

Insects described in 1862
Pentatomini